The dark-bellied cinclodes (Cinclodes patagonicus) is a species of bird in the family Furnariidae. It is found in Argentina and Chile. Its natural habitats are rivers and rocky shores. The dark-bellied cinclodes is distributed in Chile from about Santiago southwards to Tierra del Fuego and in adjacent areas of extreme western Argentina. It is found near streams, lakes and marshlands from sea level up to 2,500 m. It has a bold white supercilium and throat.

Taxonomy
The dark-bellied cinclodes was formally described in 1789 by the German naturalist Johann Friedrich Gmelin in his revised and expanded edition of Carl Linnaeus's Systema Naturae. He placed it with the wagtails in the genus Motacilla and coined the binomial name Motacilla patagonica. Gmelin based his description on the "Patagonian warbler" that had been described in 1783 by the English ornithologist John Latham in his book A General Synopsis of Birds. Latham had examined specimens in the Leverian Museum in London. The dark-bellied cinclodes is now one of 15 species placed in the genus Cinclodes that was introduced in 1840 by George Robert Gray.

Two subspecies are recognised:
 C. p. chilensis (Lesson, RP, 1828) – central Chile and west Argentina
 C. p. patagonicus (Gmelin, JF, 1789) – south Chile and south Argentina

Description
The upper parts are mainly a sooty brown, with a broad white superciliary stripe and pale buff tips to the outer tail feathers. The wings have buff wing-bars which are chiefly visible in flight. The chin, throat and sides of the neck are white flecked with dusky grey while the breast and belly are greyish-brown, with the breast streaked with white. The beak is charcoal grey and slightly curved and the rather short legs are dark grey.

Distribution and habitat
This species is native to the southern tip of South America, its range extending from Valparaíso in Chile southwards to Tierra del Fuego and southwestern Argentina. It is usually found near water, on lake shores, riverbanks, streamsides and on coasts.

Ecology
Chilean seaside cinclodes often cock their tails as they walk. They forage singly or in pairs, searching for the small crustaceans and other invertebrates on which they feed. Breeding takes place between September and December. The nest is built in such places as a rock crevice, a stone wall, an animal burrow, a tree hole or on a bridge girder, and is formed out of grasses, with two to four white eggs being laid.

Conservation status
The dark-bellied cinclodes has a very wide range and is described as fairly common. The population trend seems to be steady, and the total population is large. No particular threats have been identified and the International Union for Conservation of Nature has assessed the bird's conservation status as being of least concern.

References

Dark-bellied cinclodes
Dark-bellied cinclodes [Cinclodes patagonicus BirdForum

dark-bellied cinclodes
Birds of Chile
Birds of Tierra del Fuego
dark-bellied cinclodes
dark-bellied cinclodes
Taxonomy articles created by Polbot